Nicholas Crispe may refer to:

Sir Nicholas Crispe, 1st Baronet (c. 1599–1666), English Royalist and merchant
Nicholas Crispe (died 1564), MP for Sandwich